John Holland (born 5 July 1953) is a Maltese former footballer who played as a defender and made 61 appearances for the Malta national team.

Career
Holland made his international debut for Malta on 24 August 1974 in a friendly match against Libya, which finished as a 0–1 loss. He went on to make 61 appearances, making his last appearance on 24 May 1987 in a UEFA Euro 1988 qualifying match against Sweden, which finished as a 0–1 loss. He served as the team captain on a total of 42 occasions from 1977 to 1987.

Career statistics

International

References

External links
 
 
 

1953 births
Living people
People from Sliema
Maltese footballers
Malta international footballers
Association football defenders
Floriana F.C. players
Maltese Premier League players